The Deer gun, developed by the CIA, was a successor to the Liberator pistol. The single-shot Deer gun was intended for distribution to South Vietnamese guerrillas as a weapon against North Vietnamese soldiers.

Design
The Deer gun was made of cast aluminium, with the receiver formed into a cylinder at the top of the weapon. The striker protruded from the rear of the receiver and was cocked in order to fire, and a plastic clip was placed there to prevent an accidental discharge, as the Deer gun had no mechanical safety. The grip had raised checkering, was hollow, and had space for three 9mm rounds and a rod for clearing the barrel of spent cases. The Deer gun lacked any marking identifying the manufacturer or user, in order to prevent tracing the weapons, and all were delivered in unmarked polystyrene boxes with three 9mm rounds and a series of pictures depicting the operation of the gun. A groove ran down a ramp on top for sighting. The barrel was unscrewed for loading and removing the empty cartridge case. A cocking knob was pulled until cocked. The aluminium trigger had no trigger guard.

Operation

The Deer gun was loaded by removing the barrel and placing a 9mm cartridge in the chamber. The striker was then cocked, and a small plastic clip was placed around the striker to impede the forward motion of the striker to prevent accidental discharge. The barrel was then screwed back onto the receiver. The gun was fired by removing the plastic clip, placing it on the barrel where it would become the sight, and pulling the trigger. At this point, the user would take the victim's weapons and equipment if the opportunity presented itself, and then flee. Later, the user would reload the gun by unscrewing the barrel and ejecting the spent case with the provided barrel rod and following the outlined procedure.

History 
One production run of 1,000 Deer guns was made in 1964 as an initial run, with the final cost projected as US$3.95 per gun. Rather than the Vietnam war being a small clandestine war, it became a full-scale war where the Deer gun would not be as useful as foreseen. Some Deer guns were evaluated in Vietnam, but the fate of the rest is unknown. Most sources state that all were destroyed.

See also
FP-45 Liberator, pistol manufactured by the United States military during World War II for use by resistance forces in occupied territories
Liberator, a 3D printed handgun (2013)

References

External links

 The CIA's New Liberator: the 9mm Deer Gun Forgotten Weapons

Insurgency weapons
Single-shot pistols
Derringers
Military equipment introduced in the 1960s